The Dutch men's national under 20 ice hockey team is the national under-20 ice hockey team in the Netherlands. The team represents the Netherlands at the International Ice Hockey Federation's IIHF World U20 Championship.

References

Ice hockey
Junior national ice hockey teams